Spantik (Balti Language) or Golden Peak is a mountain in the Spantik-Sosbun Mountains subrange of Karakoram in Hispar Valley of Nagar District, Gilgit-Baltistan region of Pakistan. Its northwest face features an exceptionally hard climbing route known as the "Golden Pillar". It lies east of Diran and northeast of Malubiting. The trek and adventure route to this peak goes from the Hoper and Hispar valley of Nagar District as well as from Arandu village in Shigar District.

Climbing
Spantik was first climbed in 1955 by Karl Kramer's German expedition. The most commonly climbed line follows the south east ridge, which was attempted by the Bullock Workman party in 1906. The ridge rises 2700 metres over a lateral distance of 7.6 km, at angles which are mostly less than 30 degrees, with a few sections up to 40 degrees.  It contains varied terrain, from rocky outcrops to snow and ice and scree.

The mountain is very popular with organised commercial expeditions, due to its relative ease of ascent and scarcity of objective dangers. The short 3-day approach trek across straightforward terrain also provides for easy access and gradual acclimatization.
This peak was scaled by Aus-Pak expedition in July 2011 led by a team of mountaineers from Army High Altitude School Rattu. Lt Col Abdul Aziz was supervising the team of Climbers. The peak can be approached from Nagar Valley as well as from Baltistan side. The First expedition was held in 1988, the team composed of six Pakistan Army Personnel with German Team, The first Pakistani who reached the summit was Captain (now Brigadier) Muhammad Moiz Uddin Uppal, Another expedition named the China-Pakistan Friendship Expedition scaled Spantik Peak. Expedition leader Lt Col (retired) Dr Abdul Jabbar Bhatti in a call from the summit said that the expedition members took turns to reach the summit between 1:45pm and 2:15pm on Sunday July 15. Earlier, the summit team, which had started from Camp II (5, 600 meters) on July 14, set up Camp III (6,000 metres) the same day and pushed for the summit the following day. C III was established 300 meters lower than planned, which, combined with worst weather conditions and lack of visibility during return from summit, resulted in missing the route, and it forced the whole team to spend the night outside the camp, at a time when members were already exhausted. Digging out snow caves was the only option for protection from extreme environment.

Uzma Yousaf on August 2, 2017 scaled the  Spantik peak. Uzma is the first Pakistani lady to climb Spantik as well as any peak above 7000 meters in Pakistan. She climbed Spantik Peak approaching from Chogholungma glacier above Arandu in Basha valley, Shigar district of Gilgit Baltistan.
Uzma's high-altitude team included Wajid Ullah Nagri, Asghar Hussain and Yaseen. Uzma and her team reached at the top of Spantik at 9:16 am August 2, (Wednesday) 2017.
The 43-year old, who started her climbing career by scaling 6050-metre Mingling Sar in October 2016 and 5098-metre Rush Peak in February 2017, said that it took her team 31 days to complete the voyage.

On 17-Jul-2019 a 10 year old Selena Khawaja Pakistani girl (resident of Abbottabad) reach the summit of the Spantik peak. By doing this she became the youngest person to scale Spantik and any peak over 7000 meters in the World.

She became the youngest to scale the 5,765-metre-high Quz Sar Peak in Shimshal valley of Gojal upper Hunza on 02-Mar-2018. She achieved this feat at the age of 9. Selena told in an interview that she has a special love for peaks in her heart. Her goal for 2019 is to reach the summit of Mount Everest.

See also
 Miar Glacier
Nagar Valley
 List of mountains in Pakistan
 Gilgit Baltistan

References
   
 Dave Hancock - Climbing Spantik, The FTA trip Files (Perth, WA 2004)

External links 
 Northern Pakistan detailed placemarks in Google Earth

Mountains of Gilgit-Baltistan
Seven-thousanders of the Karakoram